Peritus (Latin for "expert") is the title given to Roman Catholic theologians attending an ecumenical council to give advice. At the Second Vatican Council, some periti (the plural form) accompanied individual bishops or groups of bishops from various countries. Others were formally appointed advisers to the whole council.

Cardinal Yves Congar served as a consultant to the council upon the invitation of Pope John XXIII, but was hired as personal and expert theologian (peritus) at the council to Bishop Jean-Julien Weber of Strasbourg which allowed him to attend all the general sessions and to participate in discussions of any commission to which he was invited.

The periti of Vatican II, although their official status designates them as at the service of the council, were most often first of all at the service of the currents which clashed at the council, either on the side of a reform of the church (acceptance of religious freedom, revision of church–state relations, reassessment of relations with other religions), either on the side of the continuation of a clash of Catholicism with the other institutions and currents of society, in the wake of the councils of Trent and Vatican I (especially for the experts close to Coetus Internationalis Patrum).

As for the US, there were 86 periti altogether during the four sessions of the council.

References

Catholic ecclesiastical titles
Second Vatican Council

Canon law of the Catholic Church